Zesto is a licensed trademark owned by TJ Group Investments, LLC and currently used by a significant amount of independently owned restaurants and independent franchise chains who sublicense the trademark to franchise owners. Until 1955, Zesto Drive-In was a chain of drive-in restaurants franchised by Taylor Freezer Corp. (now the Taylor Company), featuring ice cream and frozen custard. They are recognized for their ice cream favorites such as avalanches, milkshakes, sundaes and ice cream sodas, to name a few. Several of the original restaurants operated under the chain continue to operate independently today using the trademark, but many of the original and newer restaurants are not drive-ins.

History

Zesto was started by entrepreneur and inventor L.A.M. Phelan as a national franchise chain. Phelan was head of the Taylor Freezer Corp., which in 1945 had developed the "Zest-O-Mat" frozen custard machine, and franchise agreements granted exclusive use of the Zest-O-Mat machines in a given territory under the Zesto name. The first known Zesto Drive-In was opened in Jefferson City, Missouri, in 1948 at the foot of St. Mary’s Hospital on Missouri Boulevard by its original franchise owner, Lottie Traubtz; dozens more opened in the late 1940s and early 1950s, mostly in the U.S. South and Midwest.

Taylor Freezer, reportedly growing frustrated with managing a retail business and dealing with unhappy franchisees, abandoned the Zesto concept in 1955 and left the remaining franchisees to fend for themselves.
While some former franchisees continued to operate under different names, others retained the Zesto name, operating independently of each other and without support from a governing franchise structure.

The Zesto trademark was first registered in 1985 by Zesto Inc., a Missouri corporation owned by Harold Brown, who purchased and operated the first known Zesto in Jefferson City, Missouri in 1973. The trademark currently belongs to Todd B. Jansa of TJ Group Investments LLC located in Wahoo, Nebraska, who grants exclusive rights to use the Zesto name by territory.

Current Territorial Locations

Atlanta, Georgia
Angola, Indiana
Bluffton, Indiana
Clarksville, Indiana
Evansville, Indiana
Fort Wayne, Indiana
Huntington, Indiana
New Albany, Indiana
New Haven, Indiana
Bogalusa, Louisiana
Alliance, Nebraska
Fremont, Nebraska
Lincoln, Nebraska
Omaha, Nebraska
Wahoo, Nebraska
Columbia, South Carolina
Chapin, South Carolina
Newberry, South Carolina
Brookings, South Dakota
Mitchell, South Dakota
Pierre, South Dakota
Watertown, South Dakota
West Columbia, South Carolina

See also
 List of frozen custard companies
 List of hamburger restaurants

References

External links
Zesto of West Columbia,SC
 Zesto of Atlanta, GA
 Zesto of Fort Wayne, IN
 Zesto of Jefferson City, MO
 Zesto of Columbia, SC
 Pictures of Zesto restaurants
 Zesto of Pierre, SD

Fast-food hamburger restaurants
Fast-food chains of the United States
Regional restaurant chains in the United States
Fast-food franchises
Drive-in restaurants
Frozen custard